Chryseobacterium aquifrigidense  is a non-motile bacteria from the genus of Chryseobacterium which has been isolated from a water cooling system in Gwangyang in Korea.

References

External links
Type strain of Chryseobacterium aquifrigidense at BacDive -  the Bacterial Diversity Metadatabase

Further reading 
 
 

aquifrigidense
Bacteria described in 2008